Darreh Posht is a village in Eslamabad Rural District, Sangar District, Rasht County, Gilan Province, Iran. At the 2006 census, its population was 632, in 178 families.

References 

Populated places in Rasht County